EPX may refer to:

 Eosinophil peroxidase, a protein
 East Passyunk Crossing, Philadelphia, Pennsylvania, a neighborhood
 Eric's Pixel Expansion, a pixel art scaling algorithm